Keith Jeffrey (born 4 October 1963) is a Trinidadian football manager who manages the Turks and Caicos Islands.

Career

Jeffrey started his managerial career with Trinidadian side San Juan Jabloteh, helping them win the 2014 Trinidad and Tobago Classic. In 2022, he was appointed manager of the Turks and Caicos Islands.

References

1963 births
Expatriate football managers in the Turks and Caicos Islands
Living people
San Juan Jabloteh F.C. managers
Trinidad and Tobago football managers
Trinidad and Tobago footballers
TT Pro League managers
Turks and Caicos Islands national football team managers